Greek Theatre is an amphitheatre located in Griffith Park, Los Angeles, California. It is owned by the city of Los Angeles and is operated by ASM Global. Designed by architects Samuel Tilden Norton, Frederick Hastings Wallisand, and the Tacoma firm Heath, Gove, & Bell, the theatre stage is modeled after a Greek temple.

History
The idea for the Greek Theatre originated with wealthy landowner Griffith J. Griffith, who donated  of land to the city of Los Angeles in 1896 to create Griffith Park. In his will he left money for the construction of a Greek theatre. A canyon site was chosen because of its good acoustics. The cornerstone was laid in 1928 and the building was dedicated on September 25, 1930. The first performance took place on June 26, 1931, attended by a capacity crowd of 4,000.

During its first decades the theatre was rarely used, and it was used as a barracks during World War II. In the late 1940s a San Francisco producer brought touring shows to the venue. In the 1950s James Doolittle, a Los Angeles showman, leased the theatre and upgraded it with better seating and backstage equipment. Between 1975 and 2015, the theatre was managed by the Nederlander Organization, which further improved it and began a regular rotation of contemporary and classical productions and concerts. The theatre underwent an earthquake retrofit in 1995. In 2006 the facade was renovated in celebration of the venue's 75th anniversary. In 2015, Live Nation attempted to replace Nederlander in operating the theatre, leading to a joint venture with Live Nation and Nederlander, along with Goldenvoice, programming shows while SMG managed the venue.

The venue cancelled its season in 2020 due to the Covid-19 pandemic which would have been its 90th anniversary and also put up for sale their red chairs that were replaced for renovation in the terrace sections.

Capacity
In 1983, the Greek Theatre's seating capacity was expanded to 6,187, but renovations brought the Greek Theatre's capacity down to 6,162 in 1995 and to 5,700 in 2004. In 2009 the Los Angeles Fire Marshal permitted the addition of two more rows in the pit, bringing full capacity at the Greek to 5,870 seated and 5,900 general admission.

Current usage
The Greek Theatre is used for concerts, stage shows, and graduation ceremonies for Thomas Starr King Middle School and John Marshall High School, among others.

The Greek Theatre won the Best Small Outdoor Venue award seven times in the past eight years, awarded by Pollstar Magazine, the industry's leading trade publication.

The annual Bell-Jeff Invitational cross country running event starts adjacent to the theater.

In popular culture
Several concerts have been filmed at the venue, including concerts by The Go-Go's, Ringo Starr, Joe Bonamassa, Chicago, and Neil Diamond's 1976 televised concert Love at the Greek. Movies that have been filmed at the venue include Get Him to the Greek, Bye Bye Birdie, and the "Shallow" scene from the 2018 film A Star Is Born. Yellow Magic Orchestra's Live at Greek Theater 1979. "Swan Song", Johnny Cash, 24th serie of Columbo in 1974, and Season 1, Episode 24 of The Rockford Files.

See also
 List of contemporary amphitheaters

References

External links

 

Event venues established in 1929
Frederick Heath buildings
Greek Revival architecture in California
Griffith Park
Landmarks in Los Angeles
Music venues in Los Angeles
Samuel Tilden Norton buildings
Theatres completed in 1929
Theatres in Los Angeles
Amphitheaters in California